Kajra railway station is a railway station on Sahibganj loop line under the Malda railway division of Eastern Railway zone. It is situated at Kajra in Lakhisarai district in the Indian state of Bihar.

References

Railway stations in Lakhisarai district
Malda railway division